Solomon Tuliaupupu is an American football defensive end for the USC Trojans.

High school career 
Tuliaupupu attended Claremont High School (California) before transferring to Mater Dei High School in Santa Ana, California after his sophomore year. He played his entire high school career as a middle linebacker. Despite suffering a season-ending foot injury in the playoffs of his senior season, Tuliaupupu recorded sixty-three tackles, four sacks, and won the Butkus Award.

College career 
Tuliaupupu was redshirted his freshman season due to a pre-season foot injury.

He missed his entire redshirt freshman season to another pre-season foot injury.

He missed his entire sophomore year due to a year-ending knee surgery.

His junior year, he moved from middle linebacker to defensive end.

Personal life 
His father played offensive lineman at Southern Utah.

References

External links 
USC bio

USC Trojans football players
American football linebackers
Players of American football from California
Sportspeople from Santa Ana, California
Living people
Year of birth missing (living people)